Darani-ye Sofla (also Romanized as Dārānī-ye Soflá; also known as Dārān-e Pā’īn, Dārāni Pāīn, and Dārānī-ye Pā’īn) is a village in Hayaquq-e Nabi Rural District, in the Central District of Tuyserkan County, Hamadan Province, Iran. At the 2006 census, its population was 607, in 144 families.

References 

Populated places in Tuyserkan County